General Osório / Ipanema is a station on Line 1 of the Rio de Janeiro Metro located in the Ipanema borough of Rio de Janeiro, Brazil. It is the line's southern terminus. The station opened in December 2009.

Station layout
The station has a layout unusual for Brazil with the two tracks located between three platforms. Internationally this is not uncommon and is referred to as the Spanish solution layout.

Transfers
MetrôRio Bus Service runs the Metrô na Superfície bus to Gávea and the Barra Expresso between General Osório / Ipanema Station and Terminal Alvorada in Barra da Tijuca.

Nearby locations 
General Osório Square
Nossa Senhora da Paz Square
Lagoa Rodrigo de Freitas
Copacabana Beach
Beach of Ipanema

References

External links

Metrô Rio stations
Railway stations opened in 2009